Alicia Maria Gogîrlă (born 17 January 2003) is a Romanian handball player for  CSM București.

Originally a member of Corona Brașov's academy system, Gogîrlă was promoted to the first team at the beginning of the 2019–20 season making her professional debut at age 16.

International honours
Youth European Open Championship: 
Bronze Medalist: 2018

Awards and recognition
All-Star Right Back of the Youth European Open Championship: 2018

Personal life
She is the daughter of handball legend Simona Gogîrlă. Gogîrlă started playing handball under the guidance of handball coach Maria Ciulei.

References

2003 births
Living people
Sportspeople from Râmnicu Vâlcea
Romanian female handball players